Rachel Victoria Lebowitz (born 30 April 1975) is a Canadian writer.

Biography
She was born in Vancouver, British Columbia in 1975. After attending graduate school at Concordia University in Montreal, Quebec she moved with her husband, Zachariah Wells, to Halifax, Nova Scotia in 2003. In 2006, Lebowitz and Wells moved to Vancouver, where Lebowitz enrolled in a teacher-training programme at Simon Fraser University.

Also in 2006, Lebowitz's first book, Hannus, was published by Pedlar Press. Hannus is a biographical work about the life of Lebowitz's great-grandmother, Ida Hannus. It was shortlisted for the 2007 Roderick Haig-Brown Regional Prize and the Edna Staebler Award for Creative Non-Fiction.  In 2008, she and Wells' children's book, Anything But Hank!, was published. Her third book, Cottonopolis, uses found and prose poems to tell the story of the cotton industry during the industrial revolution. It was published by Pedlar Press in Spring, 2013.

Lebowitz's fourth book, The Year of No Summer, appeared in 2018. Kirkus Reviews praised it as a "vivid, disquieting collage of prose pieces."

References

External links
 

1975 births
Canadian biographers
Living people
Writers from Vancouver
21st-century Canadian women writers
21st-century Canadian non-fiction writers
Women biographers
21st-century biographers
Canadian women non-fiction writers